Lee Tae-il (Hangul: 이태일, born September 24, 1990), better known by the mononym Taeil (Hangul: 태일), is a South Korean singer, signed under Seven Seasons. He is the main vocalist of Block B and is part of the T2u sub-unit with U-Kwon.

Biography
Lee Tae-il was born in Seoul, South Korea, where he lived with his parents, elder sister and younger brother. He graduated from Global Cyber University and previously attended Kim Myung-ki's Vocal Academy. Prior to joining Block B, he was a contestant on MBC's Star Audition 1.

Career
In addition to his work with Block B, Taeil performed two solo concerts in Tokyo, Japan, on January 13, 2017. He also did a seven-show, six-city tour of Japan from August 26 to September 7, 2017, along with fellow Block B member U-Kwon as the special unit T2u.

In March 2018, Taeil was named as a judge for the Blind Musician singing competition, which is sponsored by the Korea Music Copyright Association, the Federation of Korean Music Performers, and the Korean Entertainment Producers' Association.

Taeil's first solo concert in Korea was announced November 2018 and scheduled to take place on December 22 and 23 in Seoul's Olympic Park K-Art Hall. All tickets sold out almost immediately after going on sale November 28.

In April 2019, it was announced that Taeil and Park Kyung would hold two concerts in Seoul together on May 25 and 26.

On June 10, Taeil announced that he would be entering into South Korea's compulsory military duty immediately. After fulfilling his term of service, Taeil returned home on leave December 4, 2020, with his discharge becoming official the following month.

Discography

Singles

As lead artist

Collaborations

Filmography

Variety show

Web shows

Awards and nominations

References

External links

 

1990 births
Living people
K-pop singers
South Korean male idols
South Korean pop singers
21st-century South Korean  male singers
Block B members
KQ Entertainment artists